A complete list of known songs written and recorded by the Zabranjeno Pušenje that have been released or have gone unreleased.

Released songs
All songs that appear on albums by Zabranjeno Pušenje.

Other songs
All songs that do not appear on studio albums, and their releases.

See also 
 Zabranjeno pušenje discography

References

External links
 Official website
 Zabranjeno pušenje discography at Discogs
 Zabranjeno pušenje discography at MusicBrainz

Zabranjeno pušenje